In financial mathematics and economics, a distortion risk measure is a type of risk measure which is related to the cumulative distribution function of the return of a financial portfolio.

Mathematical definition 
The function  associated with the distortion function  is a distortion risk measure if for any random variable of gains  (where  is the Lp space) then
 

If  almost surely then  is given by the Choquet integral, i.e.

Properties 
In addition to the properties of general risk measures, distortion risk measures also have:
 Monotone with respect to first order stochastic dominance.
 If  is a concave distortion function, then  is monotone with respect to second order stochastic dominance.
  is a concave distortion function if and only if  is a coherent risk measure.

Examples 
 Value at risk is a distortion risk measure with associated distortion function 
 Conditional value at risk is a distortion risk measure with associated distortion function 
 The negative expectation is a distortion risk measure with associated distortion function .

See also 
 Risk measure
 Coherent risk measure
 Deviation risk measure
 Spectral risk measure

References 

Financial risk modeling